Suzanne Legrand is a French actress, musical theater performer and writer. Her career started on French TV with the series Papa Poule by Roger Kahane in which she played the part of the youngest daughter. Since then she has played in many television series, movies, theater plays and musicals, in France and in the US. She has received several awards in international film festivals for her performance in La pisseuse ("Desperate") which she also wrote and directed with Frederic Benzaquen.
She has written and directed the musical "l'Arche" with O. Denizet and performed in it at the end of 2018. 
IMDB page

She has also written two feature films for MK2 productions and Escazal films.

She attended the Tisch School of the Arts in the musical theater studio CAP21.

Filmography (TV and Cinema) 

 Le Bouillon by Stéphanie Lagarde 
 Grany Boom by Christiane Lehérissey
 Eliane by Caroline Huppert
 Commissaire Moulin by Jean-Luc Breitenstein
 Un peu, beaucoup, voire... pas du tout! Thierry Espasa
 Fabien Cosma by Christiane Lehérissey
 Mensonges, trahisons et plus si affinité by Laurent Tirard
 Un Homme Presque Ideal by Christiane Lehérissey
 The Woman who Saw a Bear by Patrice Carré
 Welcome - À vot' service! by Claude Berne
 La Vie Quand Même by Olivier Péray
 L'Instit / "Aurélie" by Roger Kahane
 Cordier Juge Et Flic / "La Sorcière" by Christiane Lehérissey
 Amsterdam by Marco Ponti
 L'Instit / "La Gifle" by Roger Kahane
 Nuits Blanches by Sophie De Flandre
 Mickey La Torche by Insaf Maadad
 Cataclysm by Yann Samuell
 La Pisseuse by Suzanne Legrand/Fréderic Benzaquen
 Fruits Et Légumes by Christophe Andréi
 Intrigues (played in 8 TV Episodes) by Jean Marie Coldefy
 La mort d'Alexandre by Jacques Audoir
 L'Appart (played in all 42 TV Episodes) by Christiane Spiero
 Le vent des moissons (played in all 7 TV Episodes) by Jean Sagols
 A Nous De Jouer by André Flédérick
 T'es Grand Et Puis T'oublie by Serge Moati
 Allegra by M. Wynn
 Papa poule (played in 6 TV Episodes) by Roger Kahane

References

Living people
Tisch School of the Arts alumni
Year of birth missing (living people)
French television actresses
French stage actresses
French film actresses
French musical theatre actresses